The 2009–10 Rochdale A.F.C. season was the club's 89th season in the Football League, and the 36th consecutive season in the bottom division of the League. Rochdale finished the season in 3rd place in League Two and won automatic promotion to League One, ending a period of 36 years in the fourth tier.

League table

Statistics
																								

|}

Results

Pre-season Friendlies

League Two

FA Cup

League Cup

EFL Trophy

References

Rochdale A.F.C. seasons
Rochdale